Sekolah Menengah Kejuruan (SMK) 1 Banjar Agung is a vocational schools in Tulang Bawang Regency, Lampung, Indonesia. SMKN 1 Banjar Agung was established in 2010 and located in Jalan Moris Jaya Unit-3, Banjar Agung.

Reference 

Senior high schools in Indonesia
Education in Lampung